Fuchun Secondary School (FCSS) is a co-educational government secondary school in Woodlands, Singapore.

History
The school was first opened on 2 January 1986, housed in a new S$7.3 million campus along Woodlands Avenue 1. It was officially opened by Senior Parliamentary Secretary for National Development Lee Yiok Seng on 5 August 1987.

As announced by the Ministry of Education on 7 April 2021, the school will be merged with Woodlands Ring Secondary School in 2024 and move to the premises of Woodlands Ring Secondary School.

Co-curricular activities
The school offers a total of 24 extra-curricular activities, which are labelled as co-curricular activities (CCAs) by the Singapore Ministry of Education.

The CCAs offered in the school are as follows:

Physical Sports
 Basketball
 Football
 Netball
 Sepak Takraw

Uniformed Groups
 Boy's Brigade
 Girl's Brigade
 Girl Guides
 NCC (Land)
 NPCC

Visual and Performing Arts
 Concert Band
 Choir
 Chinese Dance
 Indian Dance
 Malay Dance
 Modern and Cultural Dance
 Guitar Ensemble
 Guzheng Ensemble
 Festive Drums and Lion Dance Troupe

Clubs And Societies
 Green Club
 Infocomm Club
 Interact Club
 Library 
 Mechatronics Club
 Singapore Youth Flying Club

Notable alumni 
 Somaline Ang: Mediacorp actress

References

External links 
 

Educational institutions established in 1986
Secondary schools in Singapore
Woodlands, Singapore
1986 establishments in Singapore